Langwies GR railway station, often just Langweis railway station, is a railway station on the Chur–Arosa railway (the "Arosabahn") of the Rhaetian Railway (RhB). It is situated in Langwies, lower down the hillside from the centre of the village. A minor level crossing straddles the tracks at the station.

Viaducts
Two notable railway viaducts (or bridges) carry the line over deep valleys near to Langwies. Down the line (towards Chur) is the Gründjitobel Viaduct (or Gründjitobel Bridge; German: Gründjitobel-Viadukt) which is 145m long, and a short distance up the line is the Langwieser Viaduct (or Langwies Viaduct; German: Langwieser Viadukt).

The latter viaduct is listed as a Swiss heritage site of national significance. It is 284m long (though some sources state it as 287m) and, like the former viaduct, is a pioneering reinforced concrete structure.

Services
The following services stop at Langwies GR:

Gallery

References

External links
 
 

Railway stations in Graubünden
Rhaetian Railway stations
Railway stations in Switzerland opened in 1914